Mirosław Stanisław Jasiński (born 12 November 1960 in Bolesławiec) is a Polish film director, screenwriter, official, diplomat, between 2021 and 2022 serving as an ambassador to the Czech Republic.

Life 
In 1986, Jasiński graduated from Polish Studies and History of Art at the University of Wrocław. He was co-founder of the Independent Students' Association at the University. He was hiding after declaring of the martial law in Poland in December 1981. He was core member of the Polish-Czechoslovak Solidarity (later – Polish-Czech-Slovak Solidarity).

After the fall of socialism in Poland, from 1990 to January 1991 he was head of the Political Unit at the Embassy of Poland in Prague. In 1991, firstly, he took post of the deputy voivode of the Wrocław Voivodeship, and, secondly, of the voivode. He ended his term in 1992. Until 1994, he was lecturer at the Wrocław University of Science and Technology. Between 2001 and 2005, he was director of the Polish Institute in Prague. Later, he was working for private companies such as PKN Orlen and Unipetrol as advisor and head of international cooperation. In 2012, he became director of the Mińsk Gallery in Wrocław. On 11 October 2021 he was nominated Poland ambassador to the Czech Republic. He took his post on 30 November 2021, and presented his credentials on 20 December 2021. He ended his term on 31 January 2022.

Jasiński has been also active as a screenwriter and film director, mostly documentaries, such as: Kaman (1995), Wygrani przegrani (1996), Polski dom (1998), Wojna z wodą (1998), Magdalena Abakanowicz (2000), Bełz. Rok 1951 (2001), Prawdziwy koniec wojny (2001).

Between 1991 and 2001 he was member of the Centre Agreement, Ruch dla Rzeczypospolitej, Ruch Stu, Solidarity Electoral Action.

Married to Dorota Jasińska. Besides Polish, Jasiński speaks Czech and English languages.

Honours 

 Bronze Cross of Merit, Poland, 2005
Officer's Cross of the Order of Polonia Restituta, Poland, 2007
, Czech Republic, 2014
 Medal of Merit for Diplomacy of the Czech Republic, Czech Republic, 2019
 Cross of Freedom and Solidarity, Poland, 2020
Bene Merito honorary badge, Poland, 2020

References 

1960 births
Ambassadors of Poland to the Czech Republic
Centre Agreement politicians
Living people
Local politicians in Poland
Officers of the Order of Polonia Restituta
People from Bolesławiec
Polish film directors
Polish screenwriters
Recipients of Cross of Freedom and Solidarity
Recipients of the Bronze Cross of Merit (Poland)
Solidarity Electoral Action politicians
University of Wrocław alumni
Academic staff of the Wrocław University of Science and Technology